

Moselle Franconian is a West Central German language, part of the Central Franconian languages area, that includes Luxembourgish. 
It is spoken in the southern Rhineland and along the course of the Moselle, in the Siegerland of North Rhine-Westphalia, throughout western Rhineland-Palatinate and Saarland, Luxembourg, the south of the German-speaking Community of Belgium and in the neighboring French département of Moselle (in Arrondissement of Boulay-Moselle). The Transylvanian Saxon dialect spoken in the Transylvania region of Romania is derived from this dialect as a result of the emigration of numerous "Transylvanian Saxons" between 1100 and 1300, primarily from areas in which the Moselle Franconian dialect was then spoken. Another variety of Moselle Franconian, the Hunsrik, is spoken in some rural areas of southern Brazil, brought by 19th century immigrants from the Hunsrück region in modern Germany.

Varieties 
The transition between "dialect" and "separate language" is fluid.

The Linguasphere Register lists five dialects of Moselle Franconian (code 52-ACB-dc) with codes -dca to -dce:

 Trierisch (Rhineland-Palatinate, Luxembourg, northwestern Saarland)
 Eifelisch (Rhineland-Palatinate, East Belgium, Luxembourg, southern North Rhine-Westphalia)
 Untermosellanisch (Rhineland-Palatinate)
 West-Westerwäldisch (Rhineland-Palatinate)
 Siegerländisch (southern North Rhine-Westphalia, northeastern Rhineland-Palatinate)

Also considered part of the Moselle Franconian language are the variants of Lorraine Franconian, Luxembourgish and Transylvanian Saxon dialect.

Some Moselle Franconian dialects have developed into standardized varieties which can be considered separate languages, especially due to the limited intelligibility of some dialects for Standard German speakers:
Luxembourgish (Lëtzebuergesch)
Lorraine Franconian
Transylvanian Saxon dialect
Hunsrik

Most speakers of Luxembourgish are multilingual, speaking Standard German and French in addition to Luxembourgish.

See also
Saarland (section Local dialect)
Rhine Franconian (related neighboring dialect group)
Meuse-Rhenish

Further reading 
 Werner König: dtv-Atlas Deutsche Sprache. dtv-Verlag, München (Munich) 2005;  (German).

References

 
Rhineland
Central German languages
German dialects
Articles containing video clips
Moselle